The Roman Catholic Diocese of Mongomo is a Latin Catholic suffragan bishopric in the ecclesiastical province (covering all Equatorial Guinea) of the Metropolitan Archdiocese of Malabo, yet depends on the missionary Roman Congregation for the Evangelization of Peoples.

Its cathedral episcopal see is a minor basilica, the Catedral Basílica de la Inmaculada Concepción, dedicated to the Immaculate Conception, in Mongomo, Wele-Nzas province, Región Continentale.

History 
Established in 2017.04.01 as Diocese of Mongomo / Mongomen(sis) (Latin), on territory split off from the Diocese of Ebebiyín (in the same ecclesiastical province).

Statistics 
As per April 2017, it pastorally served 155,000 Catholics (97% of the population) in 11 parishes with 20 diocesan and 5 religious priests and 32 female religious.

Episcopal ordinaries 
(all Roman Rite) 

Suffragan Bishops of Mongomo
 Juan Domingo-Beka Esono Ayang, Claretians (C.M.F.) (2017.04.01 – ...), no previous prelature.

See also 
 List of Catholic dioceses in Equatorial Guinea

References

Sources and external links 
 GCatholic with Google map - data for all sections except statistics
 CatholicHierarchy - statistics

Roman Catholic dioceses in Equatorial Guinea